Riding Wild is a 1935 American Western film directed by David Selman, which stars Tim McCoy, Niles Welch, and Billie Seward.

Cast list
 Tim McCoy as Tim Malloy/Tex Ravelle
 Billie Seward as Jane McCabe
 Niles Welch as Clay Stevens
 Edward LeSaint as McCabe (as Edward J. LeSaint)
 Richard Alexander as Jim Barker
 Richard Botiller as Jocquin Ortega
 Edmund Cobb as Jones (as Eddie Cobb)
 Jack Rockwell as Rusty
 Bud Osborne as Billings

References

External links
 
 
 

1935 Western (genre) films
1935 films
American Western (genre) films
Columbia Pictures films
Films directed by David Selman
American black-and-white films
1930s English-language films
1930s American films